Harrah's Ak-Chin is a hotel and casino located 39 miles (63 km) south of Phoenix, Arizona in Maricopa. It is owned by the Ak-Chin Indian Community and operated by Caesars Entertainment. The casino features video poker and slot machines, as well as blackjack, live Roulette, live Craps, keno and bingo hall.

In July 2011, the casino underwent a $20 million expansion, with addition of a new 152-room hotel tower that doubled its capacity.

The resort completed the last expansion in 2018 to include a 12-story hotel tower, bringing an additional 200 rooms totaling 529 total rooms. The pool and swim up bar, completed in 2012, was renovated and completed in early 2019. The expansion also included an 18,000 square foot multi-use entertainment space for live shows, weddings and banquets.

History
Harrah's Ak-Chin has served more than one million customers since opening on December 27, 1994. It has hosted more than 750,000 hotel guests since 2001.

Timeline
 December 27, 1994 – Harrah's Ak-Chin Casino opens in Maricopa, Arizona. It is Arizona's first, and only, Indian casino to have a management partner.
 October 1997 – A Harrah's Ak-Chin guest wins $330,000 on a malfunctioning Quartermania slot machine. Some debate follows as to whether or not the guest will be paid because the machine was faulty, but Harrah's eventually awards her the full sum.
 March 2001 – Harrah's Ak-Chin opens its resort hotel with 144 guest rooms and four guest suites.
 February 2003 – The casino begins to offer tables games such as poker and blackjack.
 June 2003 – Ak-Chin bingo operations move from the casino to the newly built Bingo Hall.
 November 2009 – The 148 rooms on the property are remodeled.
 December 2009 – The Ak-Chin Indian Community extends the Harrah's management agreement for five more years.
 June 2010 – Harrah's Ak-Chin breaks ground at the site of its hotel expansion: a five-story, 152-room hotel tower on the existing property. All 152 rooms will include upgraded amenities, including 50-inch flat screen televisions.
 July 2010 – The Ak-Chin Indian Community purchases Southern Dunes Golf Club, which is managed by Troon Golf. The club is open to the public and offered as an amenity to resort guests.
 November 2010 – Harrah's Ak-Chin completes a remodel of The Buffet.
 July 2011 – Harrah's Ak-Chin completes $20 million expansion and opens the new hotel tower.
 May 2012 – Harrah's Ak-Chin completes remodel of pool with swim-up bar.
 August 2013 – Harrah's Ak-Chin completes a $1.25 million renovation of the 2765-square-foot Lounge.
 December 2013 – Harrah's Ak-Chin completes renovation of the Total Rewards Center and adds Dunkin' Donuts.
 June 2016 – Harrah's Ak-Chin breaks ground on expansion.
 November 2017 – Harrah's Ak-Chin opens Parking Garage & Expanded Gaming Space.
 December 2017 – Harrah's Ak-Chin opens renovated Bingo Hall & Wine & Small Plate Bar, Oak & Fork.
 March 2018 – Ak-Chin Indian Community opens Ak-Chin Circle Pedestrian Bridge connecting Harrah's Ak-Chin and Ultra-Star Multitainment Center.
 July 2018 – Hotel Gym Opens
 August 2018 – The Spa & Chop, Block & Brew Open
 November 2018 – Addition of a 12-story hotel tower and 730-space parking garage is completed.
 February 2019 – Total Rewards becomes Caesars Rewards
 April 2019 – Pool Renovation Complete
 July 2019 – 18,000 square foot Events Center Opens
 January 2020 – Agave’s Restaurant Renovation is Complete
 March 2020 – Closes due to Covid-19 Pandemic
 May 2020 – Reopens with new Health & Safety Procedure
 July 2020 – Caesars Entertainment is bought by ElDorado
 October 2020 – Ultra-Star Multitainment Center becomes Ak-Chin Entertainment Circle
 September 2021 – Opened Live Craps, Roulette & Baccarat

Amenities

Dining
 Agave's Restaurant – a casual café with indoor and outdoor seating; it serves traditional breakfast and lunch cuisine daily.
 Copper Cactus Grill – open 24 hours a day, this snack bar offers food on the go. Fare includes breakfast burritos, hamburgers and pizza, as well as snacks like nachos and pie.
 Dunkin'
 The Buffet at Harrah's closed as March 2020. A reopen date has not been established.
 Oak & Fork – offers small plates & wine.
 Chop, Block & Brew – serving gourmet steaks and seafood, craft beer and hand-crafted cocktails & more.

Entertainment
Guests at Harrah’s Ak-Chin can experience an 18,000 square foot entertainment hall. Featuring a variety of live performances from comedy acts to national headliners, there’s something for everyone.

Additional amenities
The Ak-Chin property features an outdoor pool, complete with four spas, 12 private cabanas available for rent, daybeds and a swim-up bar. Cocktail and food service is available for guests.

The Spa at Harrah’s Ak-Chin guides guests through traditional and modern treatments including signature massage experiences, facial treatments and nail services. The Spa features four treatment rooms including one couple’s suite.

In July 2010, the Ak-Chin Indian Community purchased Southern Dunes Golf Club, located near the resort in Maricopa. Southern Dunes is managed by Troon Golf. The course covers more than 320 acres and features an  clubhouse. In 2009, Southern Dunes was named among Golfweeks “Best You Can Play, State-By-State” list of courses in the United States.

In the fall of 2012, the Ak-Chin Indian Community opened the 165,000-square foot UltraStar Multi-tainment Center at Ak-Chin Circle, operated by California-based UltraStar Cinemas. The project cost $50 million, and provides restaurants, a bowling alley, and areas for staging events. It neighbors the casino and is located in the city of Maricopa. As of October 2020, the facility has been operated by the Ak-Chin Community and is currently named, Ak-Chin Circle Entertainment Circle.

Awards
 Harrah's Ak-Chin was named a "2010 Most Admired Company" by Arizona Business Magazine and BestCompanies AZ. *Phoenix Business Journal has ranked the facility as one of the “Best Places to Work in the Valley” in 2008, 2009, 2010, and 2011.
 Ak-Chin Southern Dunes was ranked #5 in 2015 of "Best Courses You Can Play in Arizona" by Golf Magazine & Golfweek
 Harrah's Ak-Chin was awarded the 2011 Volunteer Service Award from the Arizona Governor's Commission on Service and Volunteerism.
 Harrah’s Ak-Chin was voted the Best Employer of Maricopa for the Creme de la Copa 2021.

References

External links

 
 Ak-Chin Southern Dunes Golf Club
 Matka Play
 UltraStar Ak-Chin

1994 establishments in Arizona
Commercial buildings completed in 1994
Buildings and structures in Pinal County, Arizona
Caesars Entertainment
Casino hotels
Casinos completed in 1994
Casinos in Arizona
Hotel buildings completed in 1994
Hotels established in 1994
Hotels in Arizona
Maricopa, Arizona
Native American casinos
Tourist attractions in Pinal County, Arizona
Native American history of Arizona